Tell 'Em I'm Gone is the fourteenth studio album by Yusuf (formerly known as Cat Stevens). The album was released on 27 October 2014 by Legacy Recordings. It is Yusuf's third mainstream release since his return to music and his first in five years since 2009's acclaimed Roadsinger.  The album was produced by Rick Rubin and Yusuf, and features Richard Thompson.

Background
On 15 September 2014, Yusuf/Cat Stevens announced the forthcoming release on 27 October 2014 of his new studio album Tell 'Em I'm Gone and two upcoming tours: a November 2014 (9-date) Europe tour and a December 2014 (6-date) North America tour, the latter being his first since 1976.

Cover art
On the album cover, the singer is credited as "Yusuf" with a promotional sticker identifying him also as "Cat Stevens".

Personnel

Personnel on the album include Richard Thompson, Charlie Musselwhite, Bonnie "Prince" Billy, Tinariwen, and Matt Sweeney.

Promotional tours
On 15 September 2014, Yusuf/Cat Stevens announced two short tours following the release of the album: a November 2014 (9-date) Europe tour and a December 2014 (6-date) North America tour, the latter being his first one since 1976.

Track listing
All songs are written by Yusuf except as indicated.

Charts

References

External links
Official site

2014 albums
Yusuf Islam albums
Albums produced by Rick Rubin
Legacy Recordings albums